Udea stigmatalis is a moth in the family Crambidae. It was described by Wileman in 1911. It is found in Japan, Taiwan and Russia.

Subspecies
Udea stigmatalis stigmatalis
Udea stigmatalis tayulingensis Heppner, 2005 (Taiwan)

References

stigmatalis
Moths described in 1911